Anthony Campanile (born August 18, 1982) is an American football coach who is  the linebackers coach for the Miami Dolphins of the National Football League (NFL). He was previously the linebackers  coach for the Michigan football team.

Early life
Campanile grew up in Fair Lawn, New Jersey and attended Fair Lawn High School.
Anthony would end up playing safety and linebacker for Rutgers from 2001 to 2004.

Coaching
Campanile started his coaching career as a student assistant coach for Rutgers in 2005. He then went on to his alma mater, Fair Lawn High School, for one season. Anthony served as offensive coordinator after 3 years as the linebackers coach and defensive coordinator for the high school powerhouse Don Bosco Preparatory High School in Ramsey, New Jersey, leading the Ironmen to NJSIAA Group IV State Championships in 2010 and 2011. Don Bosco's 2011 squad compiled an 11–0 record and earned a No. 1 national ranking in several polls, including that of USA Today.

Rutgers
Anthony returned to Rutgers in 2012, as a defensive assistant. Campanile helped coach a unit that finished fourth in the nation in scoring defense (14.15 points allowed per game), tied for ninth in turnovers gained (32) and 10th in total defense (311.62 yards allowed per game). In 2013, Campanile became the teams wide receivers and tight ends coach. He helped mentor tight end, Tyler Kroft to SI.com Honorable Mention All-American and First Team All-American Athletic Conference. Kroft led the team in receiving yards (573) and receptions (43). Kroft was the only Scarlet Knight to record at least one reception in all 13 games and earned John Mackey National Tight End of the Week after racking up six catches, 133 yards and a touchdown versus Arkansas.

Boston College
On January 13, 2016, Campanile was hired as the defensive backs coach at Boston College. As the co-defensive coordinator for the Boston College football team, Campanile's defensive unit ranked 65th in total defense, 93rd in total passing yards defense, 49th in total rushing yards defense, and 29th in defensive efficiency.

Michigan
On January 11, 2019, Campanile was hired by the Michigan to become the new linebackers position coach and serve as a defensive assistant and he only ended up being there for 1 season.

Miami Dolphins
On January 16, 2020 Campanile was hired by the Miami Dolphins as the team's linebackers coach.

Personal life
Anthony and his wife, Tracey, have two daughters and a son.

Campanile is from a proud Italian family in New Jersey, full of football coaches. Growing up he watched his father, Mike, coach at Paramus Catholic High School in New Jersey for 10 years. Mike and his brother Vito coach at Bergen Catholic high school , where Nunzio also used to coach before joining Rutgers. Another  brother Nicky, is a coach at DePaul High School.

References

External links
 Michigan profile

1982 births
Living people
American football linebackers
American football safeties
Boston College Eagles football coaches
Fair Lawn High School alumni
High school football coaches in New Jersey
Miami Dolphins coaches
Michigan Wolverines football coaches
People from Fair Lawn, New Jersey
Rutgers Scarlet Knights football coaches
Rutgers Scarlet Knights football players
Sportspeople from Bergen County, New Jersey